The Idea of India is a 1997 non-fiction book by Sunil Khilnani, which describes the economic and political history of India in the fifty years since Partition. It focuses in particular on the role that the national ideal of democracy has played in India's evolution.  The book is also noted for its treatment of the personality and actions of Jawaharlal Nehru in the development of the country.  Journalist Ian Jack described this book, and its description of the "intellectual foundations" of the modern Indian state, as "indispensable" reading.

See also 
 The Idea of Pakistan

References 

Books about India
Books about politics of India
1997 non-fiction books
20th-century Indian books